Salvo is a Christian magazine published by the Fellowship of St. James (FSJ). The magazine is based in Chicago, Illinois, USA.

History and profile
Salvo was founded in 2006. The magazine is published on a monthly basis. It critiques media including books and other media, and also contains other articles. The magazine itself writes most of the publication's articles on Christian issues from a Christian viewpoint; for example, homosexuality. It is located in Chicago, Illinois.

References

External links
 Official website

Religious magazines published in the United States
Monthly magazines published in the United States
Christian magazines
Magazines established in 2006
Magazines published in Chicago